Garnet Lake is located south of the hamlet of Garnet Lake, New York. Fish species present in the lake are pickerel, largemouth bass, yellow perch, and brown bullhead. There is carry down on a trail off Maxam Road on the east shore.

References

Lakes of New York (state)
Lakes of Warren County, New York